William Wyler was a German born director and producer.

He is regarded as one of the most distinguished and versatile filmmakers for Classical Hollywood cinema, directing films  during the silent era as well as the sound era, and in both black-and-white and technicolor film.

His most notable works include the war films Mrs. Miniver (1942), The Best Years of Our Lives (1946), and the biblical epic Ben-Hur (1959), all three went on to receive the Academy Award for Best Picture. He's also known for directing the drama Dodsworth (1936) with Walter Huston, the drama Jezebel (1938) with Bette Davis, the romance Wuthering Heights (1939) starring Laurence Olivier, the period drama The Little Foxes (1941) starring Bette Davis, romance drama The Heiress (1949) starring Olivia de Havilland, the romantic comedy Roman Holiday (1953) starring Audrey Hepburn and Gregory Peck, the western epic The Big Country (1958) starring Peck and Charlton Heston, the heist company How to Steal a Million (1966) starring Hepburn and Peter O'Toole, and the musical epic Funny Girl (1968) starring Barbra Streisand.

Filmography

Silent films 

 * Universal's Mustang Series. Wyler made 21 two-reeler films for this series, all with a duration of 24 minutes.
 ** Universal's Blue Streak Series. Wyler made 6 five-reeler films for this series, all with a duration of an hour.

Sound films 

References: Turner Classic Movies and Internet Movie Database

Documentaries

References 

Wyler, William